Janam ("Birth") is a 1985 Indian television film directed and written by Mahesh Bhatt. It is one of the autobiographical films Bhatt created in the early part of his career. The film was remade in Telugu as Atmakatha. The film premiered on 4 December 1985 on DD National.

Plot
Rahul (Kumar Gaurav) is a struggling filmmaker who spends his nights in empty theatres and his friend Asghar (Akash Khurana)'s restaurant. Asghar tries to convince many financers and producers to invest in Rahul's script. He mostly roams around the city and avoids going home because of his tumultuous   relationship with his father Virendra Desai(Anupam Kher), who is a fading filmmaker. Rahul is Virendra's illegitimate son  and always argues with his mother Nalini (Anita Kanwar) about the insults he faces at Virendra's house  with Virendra's family hurling insults every time he visits their home. He also falls in love with an orphan Rohini (Shernaz Patel). When Virendra's mother dies, Nalini forces Rahul to visit their house, but Vilas (Madan Jain) Virendra's legitimate son insults and heckles him out, Fed up of being insulted he asks Nalini  that why is she putting up with Virendra's double life, She explains that Virendra fell in love with her Being a small junior artist Virendra's mother opposed Nalini and Virendra's marriage and forced him to marry a girl of her choice. After this revelation Rahul angrily goes to Virendra's house to take him into Nalini's house but Virendra refuses to come and says that Rahul is illegitimate for him and Vilas will light the funeral pyre if he dies. Engraged by this decision Rahul leaves the house and tries to stay at Rohini's hostel but is caught by the hostel authorities. Rohini is expelled from the hostel and now Rahul brings Rohini in their house to stay with him, but Virendra being present there heckles both of them out of the house. After that incident they marry and settle in a house provided by Asghar. To meet the house expenses Rohini starts to work. When Rahul decides to narrate a script to a producer he sees Virendra there, Virendra chides Rahul for living under his wife's salary and dissuades him to take up filmmaking since Virendra's films off the late have started flopping. Irritated by the constant insults Rahul behaves rudely with Rohini the following night. Rohini not taking offense motivates Rahul to be more focused on his work. Asghar finally convinces a producer to finance Rahul's film. When Rahul reads his old script he decides not to make a film on it. He decides to make a film on his hardships and struggles as an illegitimate child. This news spreads like wildfire and Virendra fearing his reputation tries to stop Rahul's film by pressuring him and threatening him with defamation cases. Virendra also influences Rahul's producer to drop the finance in between the making, While shooting for the film he notices his step sister Varsha being mishandled by Vilas's friends. Angry at him Rahul saves Varsha's life since Vilas is drunk and chides Virendra to handle his legitimate son's life.   Struggling again Asghar decides to sell his restaurant without telling Rahul to arrange the film's budget. The film releases and becomes a commercial and a critical success, with Rahul winning awards for his work. At an awards show Virendra decides to arrest Rahul with the help of police but is moved by Rahul's speech at the show where in he understands Rahul's love for him,with Rahul requesting Virendra to give him the award. Virendra realizing his mistakes accepts Nalini as his wife and Rahul as his son.The film ends when Virendra and Rahul embrace each other publicly.

Overview
Janam was created after Bhatt's acclaimed early films Arth (1982) and Saaransh (1984), and established him as a promising new director of the Indian film industry, long before he ventured into more commercial endeavours.

This film was followed by other films with similar themes from Bhatt's personal life, including Naam (1986), Zakhm (1998) and Woh Lamhe (2006), films for which he provided the story.

Cast
 Kumar Gaurav as Rahul Desai 
 Anupam Kher as Virendra Desai
 Shernaz Patel as Rohini Rahul Desai 
 Kitu Gidwani 
 Anita Kanwar as Nalini
 Akash Khurana as Asghar Ali
 Madan Jain as Vilas Desai

Awards 

 33rd Filmfare Awards:

Nominated

 Best Director – Mahesh Bhatt
 Best Actor – Kumar Gaurav
 Best Supporting Actor – Anupam Kher
 Best Supporting Actress – Anita Kanwar
 Best Story – Mahesh Bhatt

References

External links
 

1985 films
1980s Hindi-language films
Films directed by Mahesh Bhatt
Films scored by Ajit Varman
Doordarshan television films
Films about Bollywood
Hindi films remade in other languages